Scythropopsis is a genus of beetles in the family Cerambycidae, containing the following species, most of which were formerly classified under the genus name Psapharochrus:

 Scythropopsis abstersa (Bates, 1880)
 Scythropopsis albitarsis (Laporte, 1840)
 Scythropopsis barrerai (Chemsak & Hovore, 2002)
 Scythropopsis boucheri Tavakilian & Néouze, 2013
 Scythropopsis cornuta (Bates, 1880)
 Scythropopsis granitica Vlasák & Santos-Silva, 2020
 Scythropopsis intricata Santos-Silva, Botero & Wappes, 2020
 Scythropopsis lacrymans (Thomson, 1865)
 Scythropopsis lugens (Thomson, 1865)
 Scythropopsis melanostictica (White, 1855)
 Scythropopsis nigritarsis (White, 1855)
 Scythropopsis pupillata (Bates, 1880)
 Scythropopsis sallei Thomson, 1865
 Scythropopsis wappesi (Chemsak & Hovore, 2002)

References

Acanthoderini